"Blood Fire War Hate" is a Soulfly song, released in 2009 from the 2008 album Conquer. It is the 14th single released by Soulfly and second released from that sixth studio album.

Cavalera's excitement for this song 
Max Cavalera commented on the Roadrunner website about this song, "I'm excited to open the record with a fast song. Usually Soulfly albums begin mid-tempo, but this reminds me of 'Beneath the Remains.' This song also has one of the biggest hooks I've ever done. I can close my eyes and picture huge festival crowds singing it. When the fast part comes in, it's just war." David Vincent, Morbid Angel frontman, is the guest that greatly satisfied Cavalera, "His screaming on that song was off the wall!"

Lyrics 
The lyrics explore each word of the song title, when hate fuels war involving fire resulting in blood. 'Blood, Fire, War, Hate' is repeated 36 times during the song including 18 lines in a row to start the song and 10 in a row to end it, plus the extension 'Blood Fire War Hate will never end' to end the chorus. Variations of Blood Fire War Hate are sung, such as 'Blood, Fire, Hell, Heaven', 'Blood, Fire, War, Kill', and 'Blood, Fire, War, Dust'. The song lyrics was written by Max Cavalera of Soulfly and David Vincent of Morbid Angel.

Personnel 
Regular 
 Max Cavalera – vocals, rhythm guitar
 Marc Rizzo – lead guitar
 Bobby Burns – bass
 Joe Nuñez – drums, percussion
Guest
 David Vincent – vocals
Miscellaneous
 Max Cavalera – production, writing
 Andy Sneap – mixing
 David Vincent – co-writing

References 

Soulfly songs
2009 singles
2008 songs
Roadrunner Records singles
Songs written by Max Cavalera
Songs written by David Vincent